Tongans in Hawaii are Hawaii residents of full or partial Tongan descent.

History 
In 1916, the first Tongan immigrants settled in the town of Laie on the island of Oahu, marking the beginning of the local Tongan community. After the end of World War II, more Tongans arrived in Hawaii.

References 

Ethnic groups in Hawaii